The Belgium women's national basketball team (nicknamed Belgian Cats) represents Belgium in international women's basketball, and are controlled by Basketball Belgium. Belgium's first appearance in a major international tournament came at EuroBasket 1950. The team has participated in the  European Championship thirteen times overall. Their best results at the event are two third place finishes, in 2017, and 2021. Belgium has also competed on the global stage, where they have made two appearances at the World Cup (2018, 2022), and one at the Olympic Games (2020).

Competitive record

Olympic Games

FIBA Women's World Cup

EuroBasket Women

Team

Current roster
Roster for the 2022 FIBA Women's Basketball World Cup.

See also
Belgium women's national under-20 basketball team
Belgium women's national under-18 basketball team
Belgium women's national under-16 basketball team
Belgium women's national 3x3 team

References

External links

FIBA profile
Belgium National Team – Women at Eurobasket.com

Women's national basketball teams
Women's national sports teams of Belgium